Treaty of Warsaw may refer to:
 Treaty of Warsaw (1705), a Polish-Lithuanian–Swedish alliance during the Great Northern War
 Treaty of Warsaw (1717), imposing the merger of Poland and Saxony, under the supervision of Russia
 Treaty of Warsaw (1745), an alliance between Britain, Austria, the Dutch Republic and Poland-Saxony agreeing to uphold the Pragmatic Sanction
 Treaty of Warsaw (1768), granting rights to religious minorities
 Treaty of Warsaw (1773), treaty of session between Poland and Austria, provided that the new frontier of Poland should follow a petty stream called the Podhorze river which was later found to have no existence; treaty between Poland and Prussia: Frederick II guaranteed the free exercise of religion for the Catholics of the annexed provinces
 Treaty of Warsaw (1809)
 Treaty of Warsaw (1849), between Russia and Austria
 Treaty of Warsaw (1920), between Poland and the Ukrainian National Republic during the Polish–Soviet War
 Treaty of Warsaw (1955), also known as the Warsaw Pact
 Treaty of Warsaw (1970), agreement between West Germany and the People's Republic of Poland,  re-establishing and normalizing bilateral relations, and provisionally recognizing Poland's western border
 Treaty of Warsaw (1990), Polish–German border agreement finalizing the Oder–Neisse line

Lists of treaties